Elwood "Woody" T. Driver (August 20, 1921 – March 26, 1992) was an American aviator who served as a Tuskegee Airman during World War II. He flew 123 missions and he is given credit for one confirmed kill. In 1978 President Jimmy Carter nominated Driver to be a member of the National Transportation Safety Board.

Early life
Elwood Driver was born in Trenton, New Jersey. He had three siblings. While attending Trenton State College, he earned his pilot's license. He graduated from college in 1942. Later he attended New York University and earned an MS in safety engineering.

Driver married Shirley Martin in 1960.  He had one son, Timothy, from a previous marriage.

Career

Driver signed up for the Army Air Corps in 1942. He became a Tuskegee Airman and was sent to the European Theatre where he recorded an aerial combat kill over Anzio, Italy. He retired from the Air force as a Major in 1962.

Driver worked with the National Transportation Safety Board beginning in 1967.  In 1978, he was nominated to be a member of the Safety Board and served from 1978 to 1980.

Driver held a board of director position at Howard University.

Awards and honors
In 2006, a Congressional Gold Medal was awarded to Tuskegee Airmen, including Driver.

Death
On May 26, 1992, Driver died at his home in Reston, Virginia from liver cancer.

See also 

 Military history of African Americans
 List of Tuskegee Airmen Cadet Pilot Graduation Classes

References

Notes

External links
 Tuskegee Airmen at Tuskegee University
 Tuskegee Airmen National Museum

1921 births
1992 deaths
Tuskegee Airmen
Military personnel from New Jersey
United States Army Air Forces officers
Aviators from New Jersey
African-American aviators
20th-century African-American people
People from Trenton, New Jersey